Miriti is an extinct Tucanoan language of Brazil.

References

Tucanoan languages
Languages of Brazil
Indigenous languages of the Americas
Extinct languages of South America